Statistics is the theory and application of mathematics to the scientific method including hypothesis generation, experimental design, sampling, data collection, data summarization, estimation, prediction and inference from those results to the population from which the experimental sample was drawn. This article lists statisticians who have been instrumental in the development of theoretical and applied statistics.

Founders of departments of statistics
The role of a department of statistics is discussed in a 1949 article by Harold Hotelling, which helped to spur the creation of many departments of statistics.

See also

 List of statisticians
 History of statistics
 Timeline of probability and statistics
 List of people considered father or mother of a scientific field

References

External links
 
 
 
 
 
 StatProb – peer-reviewed encyclopedia sponsored by statistics and probability societies

History of probability and statistics
 
Statistics
Statistics-related lists